The Nesjavellir Geothermal Power Station is the second-largest geothermal power station in Iceland. The power station is owned and operated by ON Power.

Plans for utilizing the Nesjavellir  area for geothermal power and water heating began in 1947, when boreholes were drilled to evaluate the area's potential for power generation. Research continued from 1965 to 1986. In 1987, construction of the plant began, and the cornerstone was laid in May 1990.

See also 

 Geothermal electricity
 Geothermal power in Iceland
 List of largest power stations in the world
 Renewable energy in Iceland

External links 
 ON Power: Our power plants

Buildings and structures completed in 1990
Geothermal power stations in Iceland
1990 establishments in Iceland